Hovs Hallar is a nature reserve on the northern tip of the Bjäre Peninsula in the county of Skåne, Sweden. The reserve is an area of geological interest and its impressive cliff faces are home to a variety of seabirds. It is assumed that the area gave the name of the province Halland, meaning "the land beyond Hovs Hallar".

The location is also the setting for the opening scenes of the classic Ingmar Bergman film The Seventh Seal, with the Knight challenging Death to a game of chess for his life on the shoreline, and the closing scene with the Dance Macabre against a stormy sky.

References

External links

Hovs Haller

Geography of Skåne County
Nature reserves in Sweden
Tourist attractions in Skåne County